Chad Bartlomé (born February 10, 1983 in Sacramento, California) is an American soccer player currently playing for the BSC Old Boys team in Switzerland's 3rd League.
He is also the CEO and Head Coach of Bartlomé Soccer Academy in Basel, Switzerland.

Career
Bartlomé played four years of college soccer at Oregon State University between 2001 and 2004, before signing with Portland Timbers in 2005. After a short time with Portland, Bartlomé transferred to Swiss club BSC Old Boys and spent the bulk of his career in Switzerland, playing with SR Delémont, FC Wohlen, FC Grenchen and FC Baden, before heading back to the United States when he signed for USL Pro club Sacramento Republic in March 2014.

Coaching 
Bartlomé coaches and trains students at his Bartlomé Soccer Academy.

References

1983 births
Living people
American soccer players
Oregon State Beavers men's soccer players
Portland Timbers (2001–2010) players
Sacramento Republic FC players
Association football forwards
Soccer players from Sacramento, California
USL Championship players
USL First Division players
BSC Old Boys players
SR Delémont players
FC Wohlen players
FC Grenchen players
FC Baden players